The Cornish–Windsor Covered Bridge is a -year-old, two-span, timber Town lattice-truss, covered bridge that crosses the Connecticut River between Cornish, New Hampshire (on the east), and Windsor, Vermont (on the west). Until 2008, when the Smolen–Gulf Bridge opened in Ohio, it had been the longest covered bridge (still standing) in the United States.

History

Previous bridges 
There were three bridges previously built on this site—one each in 1796, 1824 and 1828. The 1824 and 1828 spans were constructed and operated by a group of businessmen which included Allen Wardner (1786–1877).

1866 bridge (current) 
The current bridge was built in 1866 by Bela Jenks Fletcher (1811–1877) of Claremont and James Frederick Tasker (1826–1903) of Cornish at a cost of $9,000. The structure uses a lattice truss patented in 1820 and 1835 by Ithiel Town (1784–1844).

From 1866 through 1943, it operated as a toll bridge. According to a 1966 report by the New Hampshire Division of Economic Development, the bridge was plenty long enough to earn the name "kissin' bridge", a vernacular of covered bridges referring to the brief moment of relative privacy while crossing.

Other tolls, in 1866, ran as high as 20 cents for a four-horse carriage.

The span was purchased by the state of New Hampshire in 1936 and became toll-free in 1943.

Landmark designation and restoration 
 1970: The American Society of Civil Engineers (ASCE) designated the bridge a National Historic Civil Engineering Landmark.
 1976: The bridge was listed in the National Register of Historic Places.
 1988: The Cornish–Windsor Covered Bridge was rehabilitated, funded by the Federal Highway Administration.

Clarification of "longest bridge" status 
(Blenheim was and Bridgeport is pedestrian only.) The Hartland Bridge in Hartland, New Brunswick, Canada, is longer than the Cornish-Windsor Bridge, and is currently open, but the claim that Cornish-Windsor was the longest was made when the Hartland was closed.

Access 
From Vermont
Vermont Route 44 in Windsor heading southeast, ends at Main Street. (Main Street is also US 5 and VT 12.) Continuing past Main, the road becomes Bridge Street. After crossing the bridge, Bridge Street ends at New Hampshire Route 12A, which runs along the Connecticut River on the west and Cornish Wildlife Management Area on the east. Although the public sometimes perceives the bridge as being solely in Windsor, the bridge is mostly in Cornish, given that the New Hampshire-Vermont boundary runs along the western mean low-water mark of the Connecticut River. Put another way, when one enters the bridge from the Windsor side, one is immediately in New Hampshire.

From New Hampshire
On New Hampshire Route 12A (Town House Road) in Cornish, coming from the south, Bridge Road is a T intersection on the left (west). Traveling from the north, from West Lebanon, New Hampshire, New Hampshire Route 12A is a notably scenic route along the Connecticut River.

Historical marker
The marker (number 158) is one of four in Cornish.

See also 

Other covered bridges in Cornish
 Blow-Me-Down Covered Bridge, built by James Tasker
 Blacksmith Shop Covered Bridge, now only foot traffic, built by James Tasker
 Dingleton Hill Covered Bridge, built by James Tasker

Covered bridges in West Windsor, Vermont
 Bowers Covered Bridge
 Best's Covered Bridge

Other bridges elsewhere
 List of bridges documented by the Historic American Engineering Record in New Hampshire
 List of bridges documented by the Historic American Engineering Record in Vermont
 List of crossings of the Connecticut River
 List of covered bridges in New Hampshire
 List of covered bridges in Vermont
 Old Blenheim Bridge – previous claim of longest single covered span
 Bridgeport Covered Bridge – another claim of longest single covered span
 Hartland Bridge – The longest covered bridge in the world (located in Hartland, New Brunswick, Canada)
 List of bridges on the National Register of Historic Places in New Hampshire
 List of bridges on the National Register of Historic Places in Vermont

References

External links

Cornish–Windsor Bridge, New Hampshire Division of Historical Resources

Bridges completed in 1866
1866 establishments in Vermont
Wooden bridges in Vermont
Covered bridges in Windsor County, Vermont
Tourist attractions in Windsor County, Vermont
Covered bridges on the National Register of Historic Places in Vermont
Road bridges on the National Register of Historic Places in Vermont
National Register of Historic Places in Windsor County, Vermont
Buildings and structures in Windsor, Vermont
Windsor, Vermont
1866 establishments in New Hampshire
Wooden bridges in New Hampshire
Bridges in Sullivan County, New Hampshire
Tourist attractions in Sullivan County, New Hampshire
Covered bridges on the National Register of Historic Places in New Hampshire
Road bridges on the National Register of Historic Places in New Hampshire
National Register of Historic Places in Sullivan County, New Hampshire
Cornish, New Hampshire
Historic American Engineering Record in New Hampshire
Historic American Engineering Record in Vermont
Historic Civil Engineering Landmarks
Bridges over the Connecticut River
Lattice truss bridges in the United States
Interstate vehicle bridges in the United States